Gargar railway station (Persian:ايستگاه راه آهن گرگر, Istgah-e Rah Ahan-e Gargar) is located in Hadishahr, East Azerbaijan Province. The station is owned by IRI Railway. The station serves the city of Hadishahr. It is located 3 km west of the centre of Gargar neighbourhood of the city, and 5 km southwest of Alamdar neighbourhood.

References

External links

Railway stations in Iran